Saints Plutarch, Serenus, Heraclides, Heron, Serenus, Rhais, Potamiœna and Marcella (died between 202-205 AD) were Christian martyrs in Egypt under the persecution of the Roman emperor Septimius Severus.
Their feast day is 28 June.

Roman Martyrology

The Roman Martyrology as of 1916 for the Twenty-eighth Day of June says,

Monks of Ramsgate account

The monks of St Augustine's Abbey, Ramsgate wrote in their Book of Saints (1921),

Butler's account

The hagiographer Alban Butler (1710–1773) wrote in his Lives of the Fathers, Martyrs, and Other Principal Saints under June 28,

Notes

Sources

 
 
 

Saints from Roman Egypt
202 deaths